This article contains information about the literary events and publications of 2017.

Events
March – Emulating Kerouac's On the Road, Ross Goodwin drives from New York to New Orleans with an artificial intelligence device in a laptop hooked up to various sensors, whose output it turns into words printed on rolls of thermal paper; the result is published unedited as 1 the Road in 2018.
August – The Chinese crime novelist Liu Yongbiao is arrested and eventually sentenced to death for four murders committed 22 years before.
August 30 – A hard disk drive containing unfinished work by the English comic fantasy novelist Sir Terry Pratchett (died 2015) is crushed by a steamroller on his instructions.
October 5 - The Swedish Academy announce that the 2017 Nobel Prize in Literature is awarded to Kazuo Ishiguro.
October – Tianjin Binhai Library opens in China.
December – Kristen Roupenian's short story "Cat Person" is published in The New Yorker and becomes a viral phenomenon online, with more than 2.6 million hits.

Anniversaries
Tercentenary of the Aberbaijani poet Molla Panah Vagif's birth in 1717
600th anniversary of the death of the Turkic mystical poet Imadaddin Nasimi in 1417
March 19 – Bicentenary of the Slovak writer Jozef Miloslav Hurban's birth
May 8 – The American novelist Thomas Pynchon turns 80.
June 18 – Centenary of the death of the Romanian literary critic and former prime minister Titu Maiorescu
June 26 – 20th anniversary of the publication of Harry Potter and the Philosopher's Stone (U.K. edition)
July 12 – 200th birthday of Henry David Thoreau, author of Walden
July 14 – Bicentenary of the early French salonnière Madame de Staël's death
July 18 – Bicentenary of the novelist Jane Austen's death in 1817
Nov 30 – 350th anniversary of the Anglo-Irish satirist Jonathan Swift's birth in 1667
December 4 – Bicentenary of the birth of Nikoloz Baratashvili's in 1817, who introduced European style into Georgian literature.

New books
Dates after each title indicate U.S. publication, unless otherwise indicated.

Fiction
Ayobami Adebayo – Stay With Me (March 2, UK)
Paul Auster – 4 3 2 1 (January 31)
Brunonia Barry – The Fifth Petal: a novel
Darcey Bell – A Simple Favor (March 1)
Dan Brown – Origin (October 3)
Peter Carey – A Long Way From Home (October 30, Australia)
J. M. Coetzee – The Schooldays of Jesus (February 21)
Claire G. Coleman – Terra Nullius
Curtis Dawkins – The Graybar Hotel (July 4)
Didier Decoin – Le bureau des jardins et des étangs (The Office of Gardens and Ponds) (France)
Steve Erickson – Shadowbahn
Christine Féret-Fleury – La fille qui lisait dans le Métro (The Girl who Read on the Metro) (March 9, France)
Karl Geary –  Montpelier Parade (August 31)
John Grisham – Camino Island (June 6)
Mohsin Hamid – Exit West (March 2, UK)
Catherine Hernandez - Scarborough
Alan Hollinghurst – The Sparsholt Affair (September 26, UK)
Gail Honeyman – Eleanor Oliphant is Completely Fine (UK)
N. K. Jemisin – The Stone Sky (August 15)
Lisa Jewell – Then She Was Gone (July 27, UK)
The Justified Ancients of Mu Mu (Bill Drummond and Jimmy Cauty) – 2023 (August 23, UK)
Ian McDonald – Luna: Wolf Moon (March 23, UK)
Jon McGregor – Reservoir 13 (April 6, UK)
Claude McKay (died 1948) – Amiable with Big Teeth: A Novel of the Love Affair Between the Communists and the Poor Black Sheep of Harlem (February 7; written 1941)
Robert Menasse – Die Hauptstadt (The Capital) (Germany)
Denise Mina – The Long Drop (March 2, UK)
Fiona Mozley – Elmet (August 10, UK)
Neel Mukherjee – A State of Freedom (July 6, UK)
Timothy Ogene – The Day Ends Like Any Day (April 6, UK)
James Patterson & Candice Fox – Never Never (January 16, US)
Tim Pears – The Horseman (January, UK)
Gwendoline Riley – First Love (February, UK)
Sally Rooney – Conversations with Friends (June, UK)
George Saunders – Lincoln in the Bardo (February 14)
Rachel Seiffert – A Boy in Winter (June 1, UK)
Kamila Shamsie – Home Fire (August 15, UK)
Joss Sheldon – Money Power Love (October 7, UK)
Elizabeth Strout – Anything is Possible (April 25)
J. R. R. Tolkien (died 1973), edited by Christopher Tolkien – Beren and Lúthien (June 1, UK; original version written 1917)
Zlatko Topčić
Dagmar
The Final Word (Zavrsna rijec)
Éric Vuillard – The Order of the Day (L'Ordre du jour) (April 29, France)
Jesmyn Ward – Sing, Unburied, Sing (September 5)
Sarah Winman – Tin Man (July 27, UK)
Kathleen Winter – Lost in September

Children and young people
Galia Bernstein – I Am a Cat (November, Australia, Singapore)
Sarah Crossan – Moonrise (September 1, UK)
Lissa Evans – Wed Wabbit (January 5, UK)
Susie Ghahremani – Stack the Cats (USA)
Connie Glynn – Undercover Princess (October 30, UK)
Kiran Millwood Hargrave – The Island at the End of Everything (May 4, UK)
Amanda Hocking – Freeks (January 3)
Anna McQuinn – Lulu Gets a Cat
Philip Pullman – La Belle Sauvage, first volume in The Book of Dust trilogy (October 19, UK)
Katherine Rundell – The Explorer (August 10, UK)
Angie Thomas – The Hate U Give (September 28)
Jacqueline Wilson – Wave Me Goodbye (May 18, UK)

Poetry

Helen Dunmore (died June 5) – Inside the Wave (April 27, UK)
Robert Macfarlane (illustrated by Jackie Morris) – The Lost Words: A Spell Book (October, UK)
Sinéad Morrissey – On Balance (May 25)

Drama
Jez Butterworth – The Ferryman
Inua Ellams – Barber Shop Chronicles

Non-fiction
Nathaniel Frank – Awakening: How Gays and Lesbians Brought Marriage Equality to America
Howard W. French – Everything Under the Heavens: How the Past Helps Shape China's Push for Global Power
David Grann – Killers of the Flower Moon
Michel Houellebecq – En présence de Schopenhauer (January 11, France)
Christine Hyung-Oak Lee – Tell Me Everything You Don't Remember (February 14)
Obi Kaufmann – The California Field Atlas (September 1)
Roel Konijnendijk - Classical Greek Tactics
Jamie Oliver – 5 Ingredients – Quick and Easy Food (August 24, UK)
Walter Scheidel – The Great Leveler: Violence and the History of Inequality from the Stone Age to the Twenty-First Century
Matt Taibbi – Insane Clown President (January 17)
Hedi Yahmed – I Was in Raqqa (كنت في الرقة)

Biography and memoirs
Craig Brown – Ma’am Darling: 99 Glimpses of Princess Margaret (September 21, UK)
Richard Ford – Between Them: Remembering My Parents (May 2)
Adam Kay – This is Going to Hurt: Secret Diaries of a Junior Doctor (September 7, UK)
Caroline Moorehead – A Bold and Dangerous Family: The Rossellis and the Fight Against Mussolini (June 15)
Rebecca Stott – In the Days of Rain: a daughter, a father, a cult (June 1, UK)
Stephen Westaby – Fragile Lives: A Heart Surgeon's Stories of Life and Death on the Operating Table (February 9, UK)
Xiaolu Guo – Once Upon a Time in the East (January 26)

Deaths
Birth years link to the corresponding "[year] in literature" article:
January 2 – John Berger, English novelist, painter, art critic and poet, 90 (born 1926)
January 12 – William Peter Blatty, American author (The Exorcist), 89 (born 1928)
January 25:
Buchi Emecheta, Nigerian novelist and children's writer (The Bride Price, The Joys of Motherhood), 72 (born 1944)
Harry Mathews, American novelist and poet, 86 (born 1930)
January 29 – Howard Frank Mosher, American novelist (Where the Rivers Flow North), 74 (born 1942)
January 30 - Teresa Amy, Uruguayan poet and translator, 66 (born 1950)
February 1 – William Melvin Kelley, African-American novelist, 79 (born 1937)
February 8 – Tom Raworth, English poet, 78 (born 1938)
March 10 – Robert James Waller, American novelist (The Bridges of Madison County), 77 (b. 1939)
March 16 – Torgny Lindgren, Swedish writer, 78 (born 1938)
March 17 – Derek Walcott, Saint Lucian poet and playwright, Nobel Laureate in 1992, 87 (b. 1930)
April 1 – Yevgeny Yevtushenko, Russian poet, 84 (b. 1933)
May 1:
Anatoly Aleksin, Russian writer and poet, 92
Mohamed Talbi, Tunisian historian, 95
May 24 – Denis Johnson, American poet, novelist (Tree of Smoke), and short story writer (Jesus' Son), 67 (born 1949).
June 2 
Jaroslav Kořán, Czech translator, writer and politician, 77
Barrie Pettman, English author, publisher and philanthropist, 73
S. Abdul Rahman, Indian poet, 79
June 4
Juan Goytisolo, Spanish essayist, poet and novelist, 86
Jack Trout, American marketer and author, 82
June 5 
Helen Dunmore, English poet, novelist and children's writer, 64 (born 1952)
Anna Jókai, Hungarian writer, 84
June 8 – Naseem Khan, British journalist, 77
June 12 – C. Narayana Reddy, Indian poet and writer, Jnanpith Awardee, 85
June 27 – Michael Bond, English author (Paddington Bear), 91 (born 1926)
June 28 – Bruce Stewart, New Zealand author and playwright, 80
July 2
Tony Bianchi, Welsh-language author, 65
Jack Collom, American poet, essayist and poetry teacher, 85
Abiola Irele, Nigerian literary critic, 81
Fay Zwicky, Australian poet, 83
July 5 – Irina Ratushinskaya, Russian poet, 63 (cancer)
July 9
Miep Diekmann, Dutch writer of children's literature, 92 (born 1925)
Anton Nossik, Russian writer and internet entrepreneur, 51 (heart attack)
July 10 – Peter Härtling, German writer and poet, 83
September 23 – Harvey Jacobs, American author, 87
November 20 - Amir Hamed, Uruguayan writer, essayist and translator, 55 (born 1962) 
December 28 – Sue Grafton, American mystery author, 77

Awards
In alphabetical order of prize names:
Baileys Women's Prize for Fiction: Naomi Alderman for The Power
Baillie Gifford Prize: David France for How to Survive a Plague
Booker Prize: George Saunders for Lincoln in the Bardo
Caine Prize for African Writing: Bushra Elfadil, "The Story of the Girl Whose Bird Flew Away"
Camões Prize: Manuel Alegre
Costa Book Awards: Helen Dunmore (died June 5) for Inside the Wave (poetry)
Danuta Gleed Literary Award: Kris Bertin, Bad Things Happen
David Cohen Prize: Tom Stoppard
Dayne Ogilvie Prize: Kai Cheng Thom
Desmond Elliott Prize: Francis Spufford, Golden Hill
DSC Prize for South Asian Literature:
Dylan Thomas Prize: Fiona McFarlane for The High Places
European Book Prize: David Van Reybrouck, Zink and, Raffaele Simone, Si la démocratie fait faillite
Folio Prize: Hisham Matar for The Return
German Book Prize: Robert Menasse for Die Hauptstadt
Goldsmiths Prize: Nicola Barker for H(a)ppy
Gordon Burn Prize: Denise Mina for The Long Drop
Governor General's Award for English-language fiction: Joel Thomas Hynes, We'll All Be Burnt in Our Beds Some Night
Governor General's Award for French-language fiction: Christian Guay-Poliquin, Le Poids de la neige
Grand Prix du roman de l'Académie française:
Hugo Award for Best Novel: N. K. Jemisin for The Obelisk Gate
International Booker Prize: David Grossman for A Horse Walks Into a Bar
International Prize for Arabic Fiction: Mohammed Hasan Alwan for A Small Death
International Dublin Literary Award: José Eduardo Agualusa for A General Theory of Oblivion
James Tait Black Memorial Prize for Fiction:
James Tait Black Memorial Prize for Biography:
Kerry Group Irish Fiction Award:
Lambda Literary Awards: Various categories, see 29th Lambda Literary Awards
Miguel de Cervantes Prize:
Miles Franklin Award: Josephine Wilson for Extinctions
National Biography Award:
National Book Award for Fiction:
National Book Critics Circle Award:
Newdigate Prize: Dominic Hand
Nike Award:
Nobel Prize in Literature: Kazuo Ishiguro
PEN/Faulkner Award for Fiction: Imbolo Mbue for Behold the Dreamers
PEN Center USA Fiction Award:
Premio Planeta de Novela:
Premio Strega:
Pritzker Literature Award for Lifetime Achievement in Military Writing:
Prix Goncourt:
Pulitzer Prize for Fiction: Colson Whitehead for The Underground Railroad
Pulitzer Prize for Poetry: Tyehimba Jess for Olio
RBC Taylor Prize: Ross King for Mad Enchantment: Claude Monet and the Painting of the Water Lilies
Rogers Writers' Trust Fiction Prize: David Chariandy, Brother
Russian Booker Prize:
Scotiabank Giller Prize: Michael Redhill, Bellevue Square
Golden Wreath of Struga Poetry Evenings:
Walter Scott Prize: Sebastian Barry for Days Without End
W.Y. Boyd Literary Award for Excellence in Military Fiction:
Zbigniew Herbert International Literary Award: Breyten Breytenbach

See also

References

 
Years of the 21st century in literature
2017-related lists